Sultan  Al Nuaimi (born 19 July 1993) is an Emirati Professional boxer. As an amateur, he is a two times national champion who represented United Arab Emirates at the 2018 Asian Games and he is representing his country at the 2021 AIBA World Boxing Championships to be qualified for 2020 Summer Olympics which will be held in Tokyo 2021 as a flyweight.

References

Super-flyweight boxers
Living people
1993 births
Flyweight boxers
Emirati male boxers